Acquaviva Picena is a comune (municipality) in the Province of Ascoli Piceno in the Italian region Marche. The village lies on a hill over the Valley of Tronto, just a few kilometres from the Adriatic Sea and San Benedetto del Tronto. From the top of the hill (365 m.s.l.), it’s possible to see the Sibillini Mountains (Monte Vettore), and even the further away Gran Sasso and Majella.

History 
The Acquaviva area has been inhabited since prehistory, proof of that are several archaeological finds, most of which are from the Piceno age, but also from the Roman Age. When the Picentes (or Piceni, Italian), which settled here during the 6th century b.C., were subdued by Roman forces, the village of Acquaviva survived thanks to the closeness to Castrum Truentinum.

During the Barbarian Invasions the village grew into an urban settlement: the coming of Lombards and Saracens forced the coastal population to move inland. The village was originally owned by the Farfa Abbey (947), then became feud of the Acquaviva’s family (hence the name) that build the fortress during the 13th century.

In 1341 Acquaviva became under control of the city of Fermo and became a garrison against enemy territory, keeping coastal villages (San Benedetto in Albula) out of the reach of Ascoli. During the 4th century the village population grew, bringing its numbers to twice its original size. The eastern section of the village was built and named “Terra nuova” to separate it from “Terra Vecchia” which was the original settlement, just before the fortress. That made it necessary to build another section of the fortress on the same side, to the East.

As part of the Papal States, Acquaviva was annexed with a plebiscite vote to the Kingdom of Italy in 1860.

Main sights

Fortress of Acquaviva (13th-14th century). A large medieval fortress, among the biggest and better preserved in the Marche region, restored in the 4th century by Baccio Pontelli
Clock tower
Church of San Nicolò. Built during the 16th century and restored during the 19th century. The horizontal cornice facade with tympanum hosts the main door, sculpted by craftsmen of the school of Ascoli. Interior has a Latin cross shape with a central nave and holds several works of art, mostly paintings and statues
Church of San Rocco (13th century). Built by the Augustinians in 1613,  with a cloister
Church of San Giuseppe
Church of Madonna della Pietà
Church of San Francesco. A Franciscan convent with cloister, the oldest in the Marca Fermana, founded by San Francesco d’Assisi himself, today neglected;
Country church of Santa Maria delle Palme
Country church of Santa Maria in Accubitu

Culture 
Events in the town include:
  Acquaviva Comics Academy, started in 1996 as Acquaviva nei Fumetti and abolished in 2006
 The historical reenactment Sponsalia, which  stages the wedding between Forasteria d’Acquaviva and Rainaldo di Brunforte (1234). Started in 1988 between the months of July and August, two city districts, Aquila and Civetta, compete in the Palio del Duca, a series of trials of medieval sports. A four district (Aquila, Civetta, Falco, Picchio) Palio for elementary and middle school children takes place every year during the month of June.

References

External links

 Official website

Cities and towns in the Marche